Compsoptera caesaraugustanus is a moth of the family Geometridae. It was described by Redondo in 1995. It is found in Spain.

References

Moths described in 1995
Ennominae